2-Fluoroadenine (2-FA) is a toxic adenine antimetabolite which can be used in laboratory biological research for counterselection of wildtype bacterial or eukaryotic (i.e. animals, yeast, plants, diatoms, brown algae) APT (adenine phosphoribosyltransferase) genes. Therefore, knockouts or mutants for APT, which are resistant to 2-FA, can be selected.

See also
5-Fluoroorotic acid (5-FOA)

References

Fluoroarenes
Purines